William Hall (27 January 1889 – fourth ¼ 1964) was an English rugby union and professional rugby league footballer who played in the 1910s and 1920s.

Background
Billy Hall was born in Gloucester, Gloucestershire.

Playing career

International honours
Billy Hall won caps for England (RL) while at Oldham in 1914 against Wales, in 1921 against Australia, and won caps for Great Britain (RL) while at Oldham in 1914 against Australia (3 matches), and New Zealand.

Billy played in the famous "Rorkes Drift" test against Australia in 1914, where Great Britain were level going into the third test. Great Britain were winning 9-3 and due to injuries were down to 10 men against 13 for the last 30 minutes. Hall was one of those injured with concussion and came back onto the field with ten minutes to go. Great Britain were victorious, and won 14-6.

Club career
In 1913, both Billy Hall, and Dave Holland left Gloucester RFC to join Oldham, following Alf Wood who had made the same journey in 1908. Alf Wood and Dave Holland both played at Oldham until 1921, and Billy Hall played there until 1925. All three men played in Great Britain's "Rorke's Drift" Test match against Australia in 1914, with Alf Wood kicking the four goals that would be the difference in the end.

Championship final appearances
Billy Hall played right-, i.e. number 3, in Oldham's 2-13 defeat by Wigan in the Championship Final during the 1921–22 season at The Cliff, Broughton on Saturday 6 May 1922.

Challenge Cup Final appearances
Billy Hall played right-, i.e. number 3, in Oldham's 4-21 defeat by Wigan in the 1924 Challenge Cup Final during the 1923–24 season at Athletic Grounds, Rochdale on Saturday 12 April 1924.

Family information
Billy was one of seven brothers who all played rugby union for Gloucester RFC. His older brother Charles "Charley" Hall played two tests for England (RU) in 1901 against Ireland, and Scotland.

References

External links
Search for "Hall" at en.espn.co.uk
Statistics at orl-heritagetrust.org.uk
(archived by web.archive.org) Gloucester Rugby Hall of Fame → Honours Board → Charles Hall
(archived by archive.is) The Legend of Rorke's Drift by Harold Wagstaff – Captain 1914 Lions = from the "Sports Post" – Yorkshire – May 4,1935

1889 births
1964 deaths
England national rugby league team players
English rugby league players
English rugby union players
Footballers who switched code
Gloucester Rugby players
Great Britain national rugby league team players
Oldham R.L.F.C. players
Rugby league centres
Rugby league five-eighths
Rugby league players from Gloucestershire
Rugby union players from Gloucester
Sportspeople from Gloucester